Mighty Magiswords is an American animated television series created by Kyle A. Carrozza specifically for Cartoon Network Video as the network's first online original series. The web shorts officially premiered online on May 6, 2015 as well as the interactive games shown in the app Cartoon Network Anything.

On June 13, 2016, it was confirmed that Mighty Magiswords was picked up as a full-length TV series and premiered on September 29, 2016 on Cartoon Network. A sneak peek of the episode "Mushroom Menace" aired on September 5, 2016, prior to the official premiere date.
On February 9, 2017, Mighty Magiswords was renewed for a second season which premiered on April 30, 2018 as well as a new mobile game, Surely You Quest (in tie with its previous mobile game, MagiMobile).

The series ended on May 17, 2019 with the remaining episodes, which were previously released on the Cartoon Network Video app roughly a year earlier, premiering on Cartoon Network and Boomerang simultaneously for two weeks. The series was made available on HBO Max until August 2022.

Premise
The series is about Vambre Marie Warrior and Prohyas Robert Warrior, a cute and clumsy sibling team of "Warriors for Hire", who go on hilarious adventures and crazy quests around the world to find and collect magical swords known as "Magiswords".

Magiswords
A Magisword is a sword that contains a specific magical ability based on its design. There are many Magiswords scattered across the land and Vambre and Prohyas go around to collect them, while also using Magiswords they previously collected. Magiswords can also be bought at the Mount Ma'all in Ralpho's House of Swords, others are one-of-a-kind that can be found in certain areas of the Rhyboflaven Kingdom. Sometimes the full potential of the "Magiswords" has to be discovered by combining both siblings' efforts. Some Magiswords are also living entities that can speak human language or get sick, such as Zombie Pumpkin Magisword, Dolphin Magisword, and Carnivorous Plant Magisword.

Episodes

Background and production
Mighty Magiswords is created by Kyle Carrozza, an animator, voice actor, musician and storyboard artist who currently writes songs for The FuMP and was previously the creator, storyboard artist and voice actor for his short "MooBeard: The Cow Pirate" on the Nicktoons Network series, Random! Cartoons. Produced in Flash animation, this series is the first original cartoon show on Cartoon Network made specifically for online, since Web Premiere Toons. These characters were created by Carrozza in 1996, and was pitched to Cartoon Network in 2005–2006 under the names "Legendary Warriors for Hire", and to Mondo Media in 2007–2008 as "Dungeons and Dayjobs", before Cartoon Network picked it up in 2013. Most of the series is done in-house at Cartoon Network Studios, with the original shorts animated by their newly established Flash unit, while the overseas mid-production was done at Malaysian animation studio, Inspidea, although the in-house crew were still used for animation revisions, interstitials and other additional content. Production for the series wrapped in 2018 and the remaining episodes were released simultaneously from May 6 to May 17, 2019.

Broadcast
The Mighty Magiswords short-form series premiered on Cartoon Network in Australia and New Zealand on January 16, 2016. Cartoon Network Australia aired a sneak peek premiere of the full-length series on December 10, 2016. Mighty Magiswords premiered as a full series in Australia on January 16, 2017.

Mighty Magiswords premiered on Cartoon Network in the United States on September 29, 2016 and aired re-runs on its sister channel Boomerang from May 29, 2018 to June 8, 2018, then returned to the network's schedule on April 29, 2019. Mighty Magiswords fully premiered on Cartoon Network UK on April 8, 2017 and aired on CITV on April 6, 2018.

On Cartoon Network Africa, the shorts premiered in January 2017, and the show fully premiered in March 2017. The series also premiered in India on May 6, 2017.

Reception
The show's TV version has received mixed reviews, with the most criticized aspect being the series’ pacing issues. Emily Ashby of Common Sense Media wrote, "...Short on substance or value. Kids may not learn much from watching, but they'll undoubtedly enjoy the characters' antics and the laughable mayhem that ensues when each new magisword gets put to use."

References

External links

 
 
 

2015 web series debuts
2017 web series endings
American animated web series
American comedy web series
2010s American animated television series
2016 American television series debuts
2019 American television series endings
American children's animated action television series
American children's animated adventure television series
American children's animated comedy television series
American children's animated fantasy television series
American flash animated television series
Cartoon Network original programming
Television series by Cartoon Network Studios
Cartoon Network franchises
English-language television shows
Fictional swords
Animated television series about dragons
Animated television series about siblings
Television series set in the Middle Ages